Nazim Erdem,  (born 1 August 1970) is an Australian wheelchair rugby Paralympic gold and silver medalist.  He has won two gold and two silver medals at five Paralympics from 2000 to 2016.

Personal
Nazim Erdem was born on 1 August 1970 in the Turkish city of Kayseri and later immigrated to Australia with his family. He became a quadriplegic at the age of 20 after diving off a pier into shallow water in an effort to impress some watching girls. As a youngster, he practiced holding his breath and could hold it for up to three minutes. His ability to hold his breath for a long period of time saved his life as he was under water for two-and-a-half minutes before he was rescued. He played Australian rules football and was an amateur boxer before the accident.

In 2002 he became the first person with a spinal cord injury to paraglide solo; he was also the first person with a spinal cord injury to compete in the Targa Tasmania car rally. He lives in the Melbourne suburb of Roxburgh Park, has a diploma in computer programming, and works as a peer support coordinator for the Australian Quadriplegic Association, a Victorian disability support organisation. Erdem is also a sports ambassador for the TAFISA World Sport for All Games.

Wheelchair rugby

Classified as a 0.5-point player, Erdem began playing wheelchair rugby in 1992. He first played for the Victorian wheelchair rugby team in 1994, and first played for the national team, the Australian Steelers, in the 1998 World Wheelchair Rugby Championships.

He was part of the national team at the 2000 Sydney, 2004 Athens 2008 Beijing, and 2012 London Paralympics, winning a silver medal with them at the 2000 and 2008 games and a gold medal in 2012. At the World Wheelchair Rugby Championships, he was a member of Steelers teams that won bronze in 2002, silver in 2010 and gold in 2014. He was a member of the team that retained its gold medal at the 2016 Rio Paralympics after defeating the United States 59–58 in the final.

Erdem announced his retirement in December 2017 after playing 312 games over two decades for the Steelers. He indicated that he would spend more time with his family and his growing role at the Australian Quadriplegic Association.

Recognition
In June 2012, Erdem was named the Hume Leaders senior sports star of the week. He was awarded an Order of Australia Medal in the 2014 Australia Day Honours "for service to sport as a Gold Medallist at the London 2012 Paralympic Games." In October 2014, he and Lydia Lassila were joint winners of the Victorian Institute of Sport Gatorade Spirit Award. In 2016, Erdem was named the Hume Leader Senior Sports Star of the year. In 2018, he became the first Australian to be inducted into the International Wheelchair Rugby Federation (IWRF) Hall of Fame.

References

External links

Paralympic wheelchair rugby players of Australia
Wheelchair rugby players at the 2000 Summer Paralympics
Wheelchair rugby players at the 2004 Summer Paralympics
Wheelchair rugby players at the 2008 Summer Paralympics
Wheelchair rugby players at the 2012 Summer Paralympics
Wheelchair rugby players at the 2016 Summer Paralympics
Medalists at the 2000 Summer Paralympics
Medalists at the 2008 Summer Paralympics
Medalists at the 2012 Summer Paralympics
Medalists at the 2016 Summer Paralympics
Paralympic gold medalists for Australia
Paralympic silver medalists for Australia
Paralympic medalists in wheelchair rugby
Wheelchair category Paralympic competitors
People with tetraplegia
Turkish emigrants to Australia
Australian people of Turkish descent 
People from Kayseri
Sportspeople from Melbourne
Recipients of the Medal of the Order of Australia
1970 births
Living people